Empire Service may refer to:

 Empire Service, a train service in New York State
 Empire Service (1943–1961), one of the Empire ships in service of the British government
 BBC Empire Service, forerunner to the BBC World Service